Attenuata is a genus of minute sea snails, marine gastropod mollusks or micromollusks in the family Lironobidae.

Species
There are 21 species within the genus Attenuata, including:
 † Attenuata admiranda Richardson, 1997 
 Attenuata affinis (Powell, 1940)
 Attenuata archensis (May, 1913)
 Attenuata bollonsi (Powell, 1930)
 † Attenuata charassa (Finlay, 1924) 
 Attenuata cochlearella (Powell, 1937)
 Attenuata contigua (Powell, 1940)
 † Attenuata eocenica Maxwell, 1992 
 Attenuata finlayi (Powell, 1930)
 Attenuata hinemoa (C. A. Fleming, 1948)
 † Attenuata inflata (Laws, 1939) 
 Attenuata integella (Hedley, 1904)
 Attenuata lockyeri (Hedley, 1911)
 Attenuata manawatawhia (Powell, 1937)
 Attenuata merelina (Dell, 1956)
 Attenuata orientalis (Dell, 1956)
 † Attenuata polyvincta (Finlay, 1924) 
 Attenuata praetornatilis (Hedley, 1912)
 Attenuata regis (Powell, 1940)
 Attenuata schoutanica (May, 1913)
 Attenuata wilsonensis (Gatliff & Gabriel, 1913)

Distribution
This marine genus is endemic to Australia and is found off New South Wales, Queensland, South Australia, Tasmania and Victoria.

References

 Powell A.W.B. (1930) New species of New Zealand Mollusca from shallow-water dredgings. Part 1. Transactions and Proceedings of the Royal Society of New Zealand 60: 532-543.
  Finlay, H.J. 1926. New Shells from New Zealand Tertiary Beds: Part 2. Transactions and Proceedings of the Royal Society of New Zealand 56: 227–258

External links
 Hedley C. (1918). A checklist of the marine fauna of New South Wales. Part 1. Journal and Proceedings of the Royal Society of New South Wales. 51: M1-M120

External links
 
  Ponder W. F. (1985) A review of the genera of the Rissoidae (Mollusca: Mesogastropoda: Rissoacea). Records of the Australian Museum supplement 4: 1-221

Lironobidae
Gastropod genera